Walter Christaller (April 21, 1893 – March 9, 1969), was a German geographer whose principal contribution to the discipline is central place theory, first published in 1933. This groundbreaking theory was the foundation of the study of cities as systems of cities, rather than simple hierarchies or single entities. He was primarily concerned with the urban space and worked on the role of towns as geographic-economic units, besides analyzing the relationships between towns of the same region.

Life
Walter Christaller was born to Erdmann Gottreich and Helene Christaller, an author of Christian-themed children's novels at Berneck (today part of Altensteig in Germany. His paternal grandfather Johann Gottlieb Christaller was a linguist and a Christian missionary in West Africa.

Before 1914, Christaller began studies in philosophy and political economics and subsequently served in the German Army during World War I. He was homeschooled and educated at the Universities of Heidelberg and Munich. In the 1920s, he pursued a variety of occupations. In 1929, he resumed graduate studies, which led to his famous dissertation on Central Place Theory, which he published as the Die zentralen Orte in Süddeutschland (The Central Places in Southern Germany), in 1933.

In the late 1930s, he held a short-lived academic appointment at the University of Freiburg-in-Breisgau. Whether Christaller was a member of the Nazi Party is disputed. He moved into government service, for Himmler's SS-Planning and Soil Office, during the Second World War. Christaller's task was to draw up plans for reconfiguring the economic geography of Germany's eastern conquests (Generalplan Ost), primarily in Czechoslovakia and Poland but also, if successful, Russia itself. Christaller was given special charge of planning occupied Poland, and he did so by using his central place theory as an explicit guide. His work was extended by fellow German August Lösch.

After the war, he joined the Communist Party of Germany and became politically active. In addition, he devoted himself to the geography of tourism. Since 1950, his Central Place Theory has been used to restructure municipal relationships and boundaries in the Federal Republic of Germany, and the system is still in place today.

In 1950, Christaller, together with Paul Gauss and Emil Meynen, founded the German Association of Applied Geography (DVAG).  The Walter Christaller Award for Applied Geography is named after him.

He died in Königstein im Taunus, West Germany, on March 9, 1969.

See also
 List of geographers

References

Economic geographers
Regional scientists
1893 births
1969 deaths
German geographers
Urban geographers
Human geographers
Victoria Medal recipients
Regional economists
20th-century geographers

et:Keskuskohtade teooria